Don Estelle (22 May 1933 – 2 August 2003) was an English actor and singer, best known as Gunner "Lofty" Sugden in It Ain't Half Hot Mum.

Early life
Born Ronald Edwards in Crumpsall, Manchester (historically part of Lancashire), he was brought up in a house on Russell Street in the area. During the Second World War, at the age of eight, he was evacuated to Darwen, Lancashire to escape the Manchester Blitz. It was there he found his voice as a Boy soprano at the local Holy Trinity Parish Church, and on returning home after the war, he continued singing at St Mary's Church, Crumpsall. He later joined a charity group, the Manchester Kentucky Minstrels, and with them, performed "Granada" in the 1954 talent show What Makes a Star?  at BBC Radio's northern studios in Manchester.

Career
Estelle gained experience by singing one song 12 times a week in the show The Backyard Kids at the Hulme Hippodrome in Manchester. He met the actor Windsor Davies in 1962 at the Garrick Theatre in London and the two men formed an act which toured theatres and clubs for four years. Estelle had small roles in Dad's Army (playing a Pickfords removals man in one 1969, episode and an ARP warden called Gerald in three more in 1970). He eventually gained the role of Gunner "Lofty" Sugden in the sitcom, It Ain't Half Hot Mum, which was first broadcast in January 1974 and ran until September 1981 reuniting him with Davies whose Sergeant Major character often mocked Lofty in the storylines. The character was given the ironic nickname of Lofty because of Estelle's  stature.

Estelle had a powerful tenor voice, and had a Number 1 hit in the UK Singles Chart in 1975 with a semi-comic version of "Whispering Grass", followed by a cover of "Paper Doll" which reached number 41, and a top ten LP, Sing Lofty (1976), all three recorded with Windsor Davies. Estelle also acted in the films Not Now, Comrade (1976) and A Private Function (1984), in addition to Santa Claus: The Movie (1985) alongside Melvyn Hayes, who also appeared in It Ain't Half Hot Mum.

In the first series of The League of Gentlemen, he made brief appearances in two episodes as Little Don, the keeper of the Roundabout Zoo, a zoo on a traffic island. In 2001, he appeared in an episode of Linda Smith's A Brief History of Timewasting as Little Don of the East End Art Mafia.

In his autobiography, Sing Lofty: Thoughts Of A Gemini (1999), Estelle was extremely bitter about modern-day entertainment producers describing them as being "tight-crutched, white-trousered morons". According to his obituary in The Independent, "in recent years Estelle cut a slightly sorry figure, dressed in his 'Lofty' outfit, setting out a stall of his tapes and singing to passers-by in shopping centres." He appeared as a "dirty old man" in the promotional video for The Sun Page Three Girl Jo Hicks's single "Yakety Sax" in 2001 (based on the theme from The Benny Hill Show). Estelle produced a duo recording with Sir Cyril Smith, by then the former MP for Rochdale. The six-track CD, which included "The Trail of the Lonesome Pine", was available by mail-order in 1999.

Final years 
Estelle briefly moved to Christchurch, New Zealand, where he spent countless hours working with jazz/blues pianist, Malcolm Bishop. According to Bishop,, "Lofty was clearly looking for someone to pass the figurative baton on to. He was extremely generous with time, his resources, and a shortbread that he loved made for him by a local friend. On the evening before Don returned to the UK I sat with him in his living room until after 4 am as he so passionately encouraged and advised me in my own career. Even though we had discussed business for after his return to New Zealand, part way through the evening I realised this would be the last time I would see my friend."

Beyond reuniting with family and friends, the reasons for Estelle's UK visit were twofold. The BBC was filming a documentary on the history of British comedy and had requested interviews. He also needed a liver transplant, but he became too weak for doctors to operate. Estelle returned to the UK weeks before his death. He died in Rochdale Infirmary on 2 August 2003, and was buried in Rochdale with the oversized pith helmet he wore as Gunner "Lofty" Sugden. He was survived by his second wife, Elizabeth.

Filmography

References

External links

1933 births
2003 deaths
20th-century English male actors
British expatriates in New Zealand
English male singers
English male television actors
People from Crumpsall
Male actors from Manchester
Actors from Rochdale
20th-century English singers
21st-century English singers
20th-century British male singers
21st-century British male singers